Cuproxena flosculana is a species of moth of the family Tortricidae. It is found in Mexico (Veracruz) and Guatemala.

The wingspan is about 13 mm. The forewings are tawny reddish, becoming golden yellow on the upper half of the base and along the edge of the costa. The hindwings are ochreous red.

References

Moths described in 1914
Cuproxena